Jacob Schick (September 16, 1877 – July 3, 1937) was an American military officer, inventor, and entrepreneur who patented an early electric razor and started the Schick Dry Shaver, Inc. razor company. He is the father of electric razors. 

Schick became a Canadian citizen in 1935 to avoid an investigation by the Joint Congressional Committee on Tax Evasion & Avoidance after he moved most of his wealth to a series of holding companies in the Bahamas.

Early life
At the early age of 16, Schick was in charge of a railroad line that ran from Los Corrillos, New Mexico to a coal mine opened by his father. Schick enlisted in the 14th Infantry Regiment in 1898 and was shortly thereafter assigned to the Philippines in the 1st Division 8th Army Corps. He returned to the Philippines from 1903-1905 as a 2nd Lieutenant with the 8th Infantry Regiment. He returned to the U.S. suffering from dysentery, where one version of the invention story claims he conceived of the idea of an electric razor. He was promoted to first lieutenant and was transferred to the 22nd Infantry Regiment in Alaska a year later, where he helped to lay telegraph lines for the military. He officially separated from the military in 1910, but returned to duty from 1916-1918 as a Captain (eventually promoted to Lt. Colonel) due to the outbreak of World War I.

Career

Business

Jacob Schick's first business venture, the Magazine Repeating Razor Co. (founded 1926) sold a razor with injection cartridge blades designed much like a repeating rifle, where the blades were sold in clips that could be loaded into the razor without touching the blade. This business provided the necessary capital to develop his electric razor concept when he sold it to the American Chain & Cable Company in 1928.

Inventions
Successfully patented first electric razor in May 1930. Also patented the General Jacobs Boat for use in shallow water, and an improved pencil sharpener.

Later life

After moving to Canada, Schick died from complications due to a kidney operation. He was survived by his wife Florence Leavitt Schick Stedman, and his two daughters Nirginia and Barbara. He is buried in the Mount Royal Cemetery in Montreal, Quebec.

References

1877 births
1937 deaths
19th-century American inventors
20th-century American inventors
People from Ottumwa, Iowa
American emigrants to Canada
Naturalized citizens of Canada
Canadian inventors
United States Army officers